The 2005 UIM F1 World Championship was the 22nd season of Formula 1 Powerboat racing. The calendar consisted of six events, beginning in Portimão, Portugal on 22 May 2005, and ending in Sharjah, UAE on 16 December 2005. Guido Cappellini, driving for the Tamoil F1 Team, clinched his ninth world title, re-taking the championship from defending champion Scott Gillman.

Teams and drivers

Season calendar

Results and standings
Points were awarded to the top 10 classified finishers. A maximum of two boats per team were eligible for points in the teams' championship.

Drivers standings

† Half points were awarded at the Grand Prix of Singapore as less than 70% of the race distance had been completed.

Teams standings
Only boats with results eligible for points counting towards the teams' championship are shown here.

† Half points were awarded at the Grand Prix of Singapore as less than 70% of the race distance had been completed.

References

External links
 The official website of the UIM F1 H2O World Championship
 The official website of the Union Internationale Motonautique

F1 Powerboat World Championship
Formula 1 Powerboat seasons
F1 Powerboat World Championship